Xaythany is a district of Vientiane Prefecture, Laos.

References

Populated places in Vientiane Prefecture